Roine Jansson is a Swedish artist and illustrator. His work focuses on modern mine workers, mining in Northern Europe, and the trade workers movement in the EU.

Education and career
Jansson was born on November 11, 1952 in Uppsala and currently lives in Österbybruk, Sweden. He studied Art at Uppsala University, Uppsala Sweden, and  sculpture at Konstfack. He has worked as an iron miner and is currently a firefighter. He has been painting since the early 1970s and has created public art for the cities of Stockholm, Uppsala, and Österbybruk. In his work he uses a variety of mediums and techniques, such as charcoal, oil, watercolor, Fresco-secco, wood, and stone.

Books
Gruvarbetare i Ord och Bild (Miners in words and pictures) Roine Jansson, och Math Isacson, Repro 8 AB Stockholm, Sweden. 2011, Swedish, 211 p, An illustrated history of modern mine workers in Sweden, France and Belgium.

Kvinnors liv och arbete i Europa : röster från industri och lantbruk i Belgien, Frankrike, Luxemburg och Sverige (Women's lives and work in Europe: voices from industry and agriculture in Belgium, France, Luxembourg and Sweden)   Carmelina Carracillo, Roine Jansson Cuesmes : Cerisiers France, 2002, Swedish, 181 p,  .

"Några Gjorde hålen..." (Some Made the Holes ...) Mary Hamberg & Roine Jansson Hamberg, (INB) Stockholm: Backstrom, 2004 Swedish 182, p.  Short stories about miners with watercolor illustrations

References

1952 births
Living people
Swedish artists
People from Uppsala
Swedish miners